Săpata is a commune in Argeș County, Muntenia, Romania. It is composed of eight villages: Bănărești, Dealu Bradului, Drăghicești, Găinușa, Lipia, Mârțești (the commune centre), Popești and Turcești.

References

Communes in Argeș County
Localities in Muntenia